Many adherents of Buddhism have experienced religious persecution because of their adherence to the Buddhist practice, including unwarranted arrests, imprisonment, beating, torture, and/or execution. The term also may be used in reference to the confiscation or destruction of property, temples, monasteries, centers of learning, meditation centers, historical sites, or the incitement of hatred towards Buddhists.

Pre-modern persecutions of Buddhism

Sassanids
In 224 CE Zoroastrianism was made the official religion of Persia, and other religions were not tolerated, thus halting the spread of Buddhism westwards. In the 3rd century the Sassanids overran the Bactrian region, overthrowing Kushan rule, were persecuted with many of their stupas fired. Although strong supporters of Zoroastrianism, the Sassanids tolerated Buddhism and allowed the construction of more Buddhist monasteries. It was during their rule that the Lokottaravada followers erected the two Buddha statues at Bamiyan.

During the second half of the third century, the Zoroastrian high priest Kirder dominated the religious policy of the state. He ordered the destruction of several Buddhist monasteries in Afghanistan, since the amalgam of Buddhism and Zoroastrianism manifested in the form of a "Buddha-Mazda" deity appeared to him as heresy. Buddhism quickly recovered after his death.

Pushyamitra Shunga
The first persecution of Buddhists in India took place in the 2nd century BC by King Pushyamitra Shunga. A non-contemporary Buddhist text states that Pushyamitra cruelly persecuted Buddhists. While some scholars believe he did persecute Buddhists based on the Buddhist accounts, others consider them biased because of him not patronising them. Many other scholars have expressed skepticism about the Buddhist claims. Étienne Lamotte points out that the Buddhist legends are not consistent about the location of Pushyamitra's anti-Buddhist campaign and his death: "To judge from the documents, Pushyamitra must be acquitted through lack of proof." Agreeing with him, D. Devahuti states that Pushyamitra's sudden destruction after offering rewards for Buddhist heads is "manifestly false". R. C. Mitra states that "The tales of persecution by Pushyamitra as recorded in Divyavadana and by Taranatha bear marks of evident absurdity."

Hepthalites
Central Asian and North Western Indian Buddhism weakened in the 6th century following the White Hun invasion who followed their own religions such as Tengri and Manichaeism. Around 440 CE they conquered Sogdiana then conquered Gandhara and pushed on into the Gangetic Plains. Their King Mihirkula who ruled from 515 CE suppressed Buddhism, destroying monasteries as far as modern-day Allahabad before his son reversed the policy.

Persecution under Hindus 

 After Adi-Shankaracharya and Kumarila Bhatta argued severely against Buddhism, the Buddhism was still alive even after several centuries but there are several theories that have been advanced to construct the fall of Buddhism in India which is incomplete yet.
Another story is recounted by D N Jha, based on Rajatarangini (of questionable authority), persecution of Buddhists also happened in the time of King Gonandiya-Ashoka (different from King Ashoka of Mauryan Empire). Jha writes that according to a book Rajatarangini, dated to the 12th century, Jalauka Jalauka (son of Gonandiya) was a Shaivite and was responsible for the destruction of many Buddhist monasteries. The story of Jalauka is essentially legendary, and its to be noted that no independent corroboration of the Kashmir tradition has ever been discovered. Patanjali, a famous grammarian stated in his Mahabhashya that Brahmins and Śramaṇa, which included Buddhists, were eternal enemies With the emergence of Hindu rulers of the Gupta Empire, Hinduism saw a major revivalism in the Indian subcontinent which challenged Buddhism which was at that time at its zenith. Even though Gupta empire was tolerant towards Buddhism and patronized Buddhist arts and religious institutions, Hindu revivalism generally became a major threat to Buddhism which led to its decline. A Buddhist illustrated palm leaf manuscript from Pala period (one of the earliest Indian illustrated manuscripts to survive in modern times) is preserved in University of Cambridge library. Composed in the year 1015, the manuscript contains a note from the year 1138 by a Buddhist believer called Karunavajra which indicates that without his efforts, the manuscript would have been destroyed during a political struggle for power. The note states that 'he rescued the 'Perfection of Wisdom, incomparable Mother of the Omniscient' from falling into the hands of unbelievers (who according to Camillo Formigatti were most probably people of Brahmanical affiliation). In 1794 Jagat Singh, Dewan (minister) of Raja Chet Singh of Banaras began excavating two pre Ashokan era stupas at Sarnath for construction material. Dharmarajika stupa was completely demolished and only its foundation exists today while Dhamekh stupa incurred serious damage. During excavation a green marble relic casket was discovered from Dharmarajika stupa which contained Buddha's ashes was subsequently thrown into Ganges river by Jagat Singh according to his Hindu faith. The incident was reported by a British resident and timely action of East India Company officials saved Dhamekh Stupa from demolition.

Historical evidence about the persecution of Buddhism in ancient India is missing or unsubstantiated; colonial era writers have used mythical folk stories to construct a part of ancient Buddhist history. For example, the Divyavadana (divine stories), an anthology of Buddhist mythical tales on morals and ethics, many using talking birds and animals, was written in about 2nd century AD. In one of the stories, the razing of stupas and viharas is mentioned with Pushyamitra. This has been historically mapped to the reign of King Pushyamitra of the Shunga Empire about 400 years before Divyavadana was written.

The Asokavadana legend has been likened to a Buddhist version of Pushyamitra's attack of the Mauryas, reflecting the declining influence of Buddhism in the Shunga Imperial court. Later Shunga kings were seen as amenable to Buddhism and as having contributed to the building of the stupa at Bharhut. The decline of Buddhism in India did not set in until the Gupta dynasty.

Archeological remains of stupas have been found in Deorkothar that suggest deliberate destruction, conjectured to be one mentioned in Divyavadana about Pushyamitra. However, it is unclear whether the stupas were destroyed in ancient India or a much later period, and the existence of religious violence between Hinduism and Buddhism in ancient India has been disputed. It is unclear when the Deorkothar stupas were destroyed, and by whom. The fictional tales of Divyavadana is considered by scholars as being of doubtful value as a historical record. Moriz Winternitz, for example, stated, "these legends [in the Divyāvadāna] scarcely contain anything of much historical value". Similarly, Paul Williams states that the persecution claims with alleged dates of Buddha's nirvana (400 BCE) and the subsequent Pusyamitra reign, as depicted in the Mahasanghika school of early Buddhism are the "most far fetched of all the arguments and hardly worth of any further discussion".

According to other scholars, the Shunga kings were seen as more amenable to Buddhism and as having contributed to the building of the stupa at Bharhut and an inscription at Bodh Gaya at the Mahabodhi Temple records the construction of the temple as follows, "The gift of Nagadevi the wife of King Brahmamitra". Another inscription reads: "The gift of Kurangi, the mother of living sons and the wife of King Indragnimitra, son of Kosiki. The gift also of Srima of the royal palace shrine."

Persecution under other Kingdoms

Emperor Wuzong of Tang

Emperor Wuzong of Tang (814–846) indulged in indiscriminate religious persecution, solving a financial crisis by seizing the property of Buddhist monasteries. Buddhism had developed into a major religious force in China during the Tang period, and its monasteries had tax-exempt status. Wuzong closed many Buddhist shrines, confiscated their property, and sent the monks and nuns home to lay life. Apart from economic reasons, Wuzong's motivation was also philosophical or ideological. As a zealous Taoist, he considered Buddhism a foreign religion that was harmful to Chinese society. He went after other foreign religions as well, all but eradicating Zoroastrianism and Manichaeism in China, and his persecution of the growing Nestorian Christian churches sent Chinese Christianity into a decline from which it never recovered.

King Langdarma of Tibet
Langdarma was a Tibetan King, who reigned from 838 to 841 CE. He is believed to have been anti-Buddhist and a follower of the Bön religion.

Oirat Mongols
The Oirats (Western Mongols) converted to Tibetan Buddhism around 1615. The Dzungars were a confederation of several Oirat tribes that emerged suddenly in the early 17th century. The Dzungar Khanate was the last great nomadic empire in Asia. In the 18th century, the Dzungars were annihilated by Qianlong Emperor in several campaigns. About 80% of the Dzungar population, or around 500,000 to 800,000 people, were killed during or after the Zunghar Genocide by Manchu Bannermen and Khalkha Mongols during the Manchu conquest in 1755–1757.

The Kalmyk Khanate was founded in the 17th century with Tibetan Buddhism as its main religion, following the earlier migration of the Oirats from Dzungaria through Central Asia to the steppe around the mouth of the Volga River. During the course of the 18th century, they were absorbed by the Russian Empire, which was then expanding to the south and east. The Russian Orthodox church pressured many Kalmyks to adopt Orthodoxy. In the winter of 1770–1771, about 300,000 Kalmyks set out to return to China. Their goal was to retake control of Dzungaria from the Qing dynasty of China. Along the way many were attacked and killed by Kazakhs and Kyrgyz, their historical enemies based on intertribal competition for land, and many more died of starvation and disease. After several months of travel, only one-third of the original group reached Dzungaria and had no choice but to surrender to the Qing upon arrival.

Persecutions by Muslim Empires

Arab invasions 
Qutaybah ibn Muslim, the Arab general of Khorasan conquered a number of territories in Central Asia including Samarkand where he broke a number of images. Several instances of Buddhist shrines being destroyed by the advancing Muslims are recorded though the religion continued to survive in some places for a considerable period of time. Bertolf Spuler cites the writings of Narshakhi while stating that the residents of Bukhara had reconverted from Islam to Buddhism four times until it was conquered by Qutayba in 712–13. A mosque was built in the city in place of a Buddhist monastery. Buddhists continued to live there until the tenth century. Similarly, Buddhism continued to exist in other places like Old Bukhara, Simingan in southern Tukharistan, Bamiyan and Kabul with suburbs inhabited by "Indians" which were also home to Buddhists. However, the religion could no longer develop as a power or distribute propaganda and its adherents also had to abandon the conversion of peoples in these regions. Scholars like Richard Nelson Frye have doubted the story of Marshaki, pointing out that unlike its statement, Qutayba ibn Muslim did not live during the time of Umayyad Caliph Mu'awiya, as this story suggests, but rather much later. In addition to discrimination, emigration, and the conversion of the laity, Buddhism and its monasteries also declined with the Muslims taking over the trade along the Silk Road as well as in Sindh.

During their conquest of Sindh, the Arabs brought the non-Muslims into the category of ahl al-kitab, considering them ahl al-dhimmah (protected subjects) and thus practicing a certain amount of non-interference in their religious lives under the condition that they fulfil a number of obligations that came with this status. Since both Buddhism and Hinduism are literate religions with scriptures, the precedent of assimilating Zoroastrians into the category of ahl al-kitab was extended to them as well. The dhimmis were obligated to pay the jizya for following their ancestral religion. The historian Al-Baladhuri notes a decision by Muhammad bin Qasim in relation to a Buddhist vihara and Aror that after conquering the city through a treaty (sulh) he agreed not to kill the people and enter their temple, in addition to imposing kharaj on them. The Buddhists had petitioned the Arabs for the right to restore one of their temples and it was granted by Al-Hajjaj ibn Yusuf. However, this decision was later violated by the Pact of Umar and subsequent Muslim law codes which prohibited the restoration of existing non-Muslim religious structures as well as the building of new ones. Despite this fact, Buddhist inscriptions were still being recorded in the eleventh century. Some Buddhists also fled and emigrated from Muslim-ruled areas into other regions. Unlike Brahmanical worship, Buddhism rapidly declined in Sindh after the eighth century and it virtually disappeared by the eleventh century.

The Arabs conquered Balkh which was a centre of Buddhism. Many people in Balkh were sympathetic to Buddhism after the conquest and they were harshly denounced by adherents of Islamic orthodoxy. The Buddhist monastery of Nava Vihara which had become a symbol of national resistance was damaged under Muawiyah I in 663. The Arabs allowed the non-Muslims to practice their religion as long as they paid the poll-tax called jizya. In addition to the destruction of Buddhist temples, part of the old city was also destroyed during the Arab conquest. Nava Vihara continued to remain open according to historical accounts. Along with it, many other viharas evidently continued to function in Central Asia for at least a century after the Arab conquests. Al-Biruni records the existence of the religion and its monasteries in the early eleventh century. The eighth-century Korean traveller Hui'Chao records Hinayanists in Balkh under Arab rule. The city was reduced to ruins by 705 as a result of frequent revolts.

It is visible from some copper-plate inscriptions that some Buddhists had moved to other domains. Al-Ma'mun (r. 813-833 A.D.) while visiting Khorasan, launched an attack on Kabul, whose ruler submitted to taxation. The king of Kabul was captured and he then converted to Islam. Per sources, when the Shah submitted to al-Ma'mun, he sent his crown and bejeweled throne, later seen by the Meccan historian al-Azraqi to the Caliph who praised Fadl for "curbing polytheists, breaking idols, killing the refractory" and refers to his successes against Kabul's king and ispahabad. Other near-contemporary sources however refer to the artifacts as a golden jewel-encrusted idol sitting on a silver throne by the Hindu Shahi ruler or by an unnamed ruler of "Tibet" as a sign of his conversion to Islam.

India 

According to Lars Fogelin, the Decline of Buddhism in the Indian subcontinent is "not a singular event, with a singular cause; it was a centuries-long process."

Various personages involved in the revival of Buddhism in India such as Anagarika Dharmapala and The Mahabodhi Movement of the 1890s as well as Dr. B. R. Ambedkar hold the Muslim Rule in India responsible for the decay of Buddhism in India.

In 1193, Qutb-ud-din Aybak, the founder of the Delhi Sultanate and first Muslim ruler in India, left defenseless the northeastern territories that were the heart of Buddhist India. The Mahabodhi Temple was almost completely destroyed by the invading Muslim forces.

One of Qutb-ud-Din's generals, Ikhtiar Uddin Muhammad Bin Bakhtiyar Khilji, who later becomes the first Muslim ruler of Bengal and Bihar, invaded Magadha and destroyed the Buddhist shrines and institutions at Nalanda, Vikramasila and Odantapuri, which declined the practice of Buddhism in East India. Many monuments of ancient Indian civilization were destroyed by the invading armies, including Buddhist sanctuaries near Benares. Buddhist monks who escaped the massacre fled to Nepal, Tibet and South India.

Tamerlane destroyed Buddhist establishments and raided areas in which Buddhism had flourished.

Mughal rule also contributed to the decline of Buddhism. They are reported to have destroyed many Hindu temples and Buddhist shrines alike or converted many sacred Hindu places into Muslim shrines and mosques. Mughal rulers like Aurangzeb destroyed Buddhist temples and monasteries and replaced them with mosques.

Others 

The Saffarids had sent looted Buddhist and Hindu icons to the Abbasids as gifts. The Mongol ruler Ghazan called on Buddhists to convert to Islam or leave the Ilkhanate and ordered their temples to be destroyed, but he later adopted a slightly less severe position. Though he had earlier supported their persecution as well as the persecution of other non-Muslims, his religious policies changed after the death of Nowruz with punishments imposed on perpetrators of religious intolerance and attempts to restore relations with non-Muslims. Although the religion survived there, it never recovered from the assault by Ghazan.

Xinjiang

The historical area of what is modern day Xinjiang consisted of the distinct areas of the Tarim Basin and Dzungaria, and it was originally populated by Indo-European Tocharian and Iranic Saka peoples who practiced the Buddhist religion. The area was subjected to Turkification and Islamification at the hands of invading Turkic Muslims.

Conquest of Buddhist Khotan

The Islamic attacks and conquest of the Buddhist cities east of Kashgar was started by the Turkic Karakhanid Satok Bughra Khan who in 966 converted to Islam and many tales emerged about the Karakhanid ruling family's war against the Buddhists, Satok Bughra Khan's nephew or grandson Ali Arslan was slain by the Buddhists during the war. Buddhism lost territory to Islam during the Karakhanid reign around the Kashgar area. A long war ensued between Islamic Kashgar and Buddhist Khotan which eventually ended in the conquest of Khotan by Kashgar.

Iranic Saka peoples originally inhabited Yarkand and Kashgar in ancient times. The Buddhist Iranic Saka Kingdom of Khotan was the only city-state that was not conquered yet by the Turkic Uyghur (Buddhist) and the Turkic Qarakhanid (Muslim) states and its ruling family used Indian names and the population were devout Buddhists. The Buddhist entitites of Dunhuang and Khotan had a tight-knit partnership, with intermarriage between Dunhuang and Khotan's rulers and Dunhuang's Mogao grottos and Buddhist temples being funded and sponsored by the Khotan royals, whose likenesses were drawn in the Mogao grottoes. The rulers of Khotan were aware of the menace they faced since they arranged for the Mogao grottoes to paint a growing number of divine figures along with themselves. Halfway in the 10th century Khotan came under attack by the Qarakhanid ruler Musa, and in what proved to be a pivotal moment in the Turkification and Islamification of the Tarim Basin, the Karakhanid leader Yusuf Qadir Khan conquered Khotan around 1006.

The Taẕkirah is a genre of literature written about Sufi Muslim saints in Altishahr. Written sometime in the period from 1700 to 1849, the Eastern Turkic language (modern Uyghur)  Taẕkirah of the Four Sacrificed Imams provides an account of the Muslim Karakhanid war against the Khotanese Buddhists, containing a story about Imams, from Mada'in city (possibly in modern-day Iraq) came four Imams who traveled to help the Islamic conquest of Khotan, Yarkand, and Kashgar by Yusuf Qadir Khan, the Qarakhanid leader. Accounts of the battles waged by the invading Muslims upon the indigenous Buddhists takes up most of the Taẕkirah with descriptions such as "blood flows like the Oxus", "heads litter the battlefield like stones" being used to describe the murderous battles over the years until the "infidels" were defeated and driven towards Khotan by Yusuf Qadir Khan and the four Imams, but the Imams were assassinated by the Buddhists prior to the last Muslim victory so Yusuf Qadir Khan assigned Khizr Baba, who was born in Khotan but whose mother originated from western Turkestan's Mawarannahr, to take care of the shrine of the four Imams at their tomb and after Yusuf Qadir Khan's conquest of new land in Altishahr towards the east, he adopted the title "King of the East and China". Due to the Imams deaths in battle and burial in Khotan, Altishahr, despite their foreign origins, they are viewed as local saints by the current Muslim population in the region.

Muslim works such as Ḥudūd al-ʿĀlam contained anti-Buddhist rhetoric and polemic against Buddhist Khotan, aimed at "dehumanizing" the Khotanese Buddhists, and the Muslims Kara-Khanids conquered Khotan just 26 years following the completion of Ḥudūd al-ʿĀlam.

Muslims gouged the eyes of Buddhist murals along Silk Road caves and Kashgari recorded in his Turkic dictionary an anti-Buddhist poem/folk song.

Satuq Bughra Khan and his son directed endeavors to proselytize Islam among the Turks and engage in military conquests. The Islamic conquest of Khotan led to alarm in the east and Dunhuang's Cave 17, which contained Khotanese literary works, was closed shut possibly after its caretakers heard that Khotan's Buddhist buildings were razed by the Muslims, and Khotan had suddenly ceased to be Buddhist.

In 1006, the Muslim Kara-Khanid ruler Yusuf Kadir (Qadir) Khan of Kashgar conquered Khotan, ending Khotan's existence as an independent state. The war was described as a Muslim Jihad (holy war) by the Japanese Professor Takao Moriyasu. The Karakhanid Turkic Muslim writer Mahmud al-Kashgari wrote a poem on the conquest:

We came down on them like a flood,
We went out among their cities,
We tore down the idol-temples,
We shat on the Buddha's head!

Idols of "infidels" were subjected to desecration by being defecated upon by Muslims when the "infidel" country was conquered by the Muslims, according to Muslim tradition.

Islamic conquest of the Buddhist Uighurs
The Buddhist Uyghurs of the Kingdom of Qocho and Turfan were converted to Islam by conquest during a ghazat (holy war) at the hands of the Muslim Chagatai Khizr Khwaja.

Kara Del was a Mongolian who ruled an Uighur-populated Buddhist Kingdom. The Muslim Chagatai Khan Mansur invaded and used the sword to make the population convert to Islam.

After being converted to Islam, the descendants of the previously Buddhist Uyghurs in Turfan failed to retain memory of their ancestral legacy and falsely believed that the "infidel Kalmuks" (Dzungars) were the ones who built Buddhist monuments in their area.

Persecution by militaristic regimes

Imperial Japan

Some Buddhist monks were forced to return to the laity, Buddhist property was confiscated, Buddhist institutions were closed, and Buddhist schools were reorganized under state control in order to separate Shinto from Buddhism. However, this persecution was short lived. The state-control of Buddhism was part of Imperial Japanese policy both at home and abroad in Korea and other conquered territories.

Persecution in Burma
The Burmese military government has attempted to control Buddhist institutions through coercive means, including the intimidation, torture, and murder of monks. After monks played an active role in the protest movements against the then-ruling socialist military dictatorship and later the then-ruling military dictatorship in 1988 during the Fall of Socialism and 2007, the state cracked down on Buddhist monks and monasteries.

Persecution by nationalist political parties

Persecution in the Republic of China under the Kuomintang
During the Northern Expedition, in 1926 in Guangxi, Kuomintang Muslim General Bai Chongxi led his troops in destroying Buddhist temples and smashing statues, forcefully turning the temples into schools and Kuomintang party headquarters. It was reported that almost all Buddhist monasteries in Guangxi were destroyed by Bai in this manner. The monks were removed. Bai led a wave of anti foreignism in Guangxi, attacking Americans, Europeans, and other foreigners and missionaries, and generally making the province unsafe for foreigners. Westerners fled from the province, and some Chinese Christians were also attacked as imperialist agents. The three goals of his movement were anti-foreignism, anti-imperialism, and anti-religion. Bai led the anti-religious movement, against superstition. Muslims have hostile attitude toward idol-worship and his personal faith may have influenced Bai to take action against the statues of deities in the temples and the superstitious practices rampant in China. Huang Shaoxiong, also a Kuomintang member of the New Guangxi Clique, supported Bai's campaign, and Huang was not a Muslim, the anti religious campaign was agreed upon by all Guangxi Kuomintang members.

During the Kuomintang Pacification of Qinghai the Muslim General Ma Bufang destroyed Tibetan Buddhist monasteries with support from the Kuomintang government. Ma served as a general in the National Revolutionary Army, and sought to expand the Republic of China's control over all of Qinghai, as well as the possibility of bringing Tibet back into the Republic by force. When Ma Bufang launched seven expeditions into Golog, killing thousands of Tibetans, the Republic of China government, known as the Kuomintang, supported Ma Bufang. Ma was highly anti-communist, and he and his army wiped out many Tibetans in the northeast and eastern Qinghai, and destroyed Tibetan Buddhist temples.

Persecution by Muslims

Afghanistan

The Muslim Mughal emperor, Aurangzeb, tried to use heavy artillery to destroy the Buddha statues but failed. Another failed attempt to destroy the Bamiyan statues was made by the 18th century Persian king Nader Afshar, who directed cannon fire at them.

The enormous statues, the male Salsal ("light shines through the universe") and the (smaller) female Shamama ("Queen Mother"), as they were called by the ignorant locals, did not fail to fire the imagination of Islamic writers in centuries past. The larger statue reappears as the malevolent giant Salsal in medieval Turkish tales.

Afghan Muslim King Abdur Rahman Khan destroyed its face during a military campaign against the Shia Hazara rebellion. An explorer named Alexander Burnes made a sensationalized drawing of the statues in the 1830s.

The Bamiyan Buddhas were eventually destroyed by the fundamentalist Islamist Taliban regime in 2001 after not able to get monetary funding, in defiance of worldwide condemnation. The statues were blown up and fired upon by rockets and gunfire.

Excavators at the Buddhist site of Mes Aynak have been denounced as "promoting Buddhism" and threatened by the Taliban and many of the Afghan excavators who are working for purely financial reasons do not feel any connection to the Buddhist artifacts.

Pakistan

Swat Valley in Pakistan has many Buddhist carvings, stupas and Jehanabad contains a Seated Buddha statue. Kushan era Buddhist stupas and statues in Swat valley were demolished by the Taliban and after two attempts by the Taliban, the Jehanabad Buddha's face was dynamited. Only the Bamiyan Buddhas were larger than the carved giant Buddha status in Swat near Manglawar which the Taliban attacked. The government did nothing to safeguard the statue after the initial attempt at destroying the Buddha, which did not cause permanent harm, and when the second attack took place on the statue the feet, shoulders, and face were demolished. Islamists such as the Taliban and looters destroyed much of Pakistan's Buddhist artifacts left over from the Buddhist Gandhara civilization especially in Swat Valley. The Taliban deliberately targeted Gandhara Buddhist relics for destruction. The Christian Archbishop of Lahore Lawrence John Saldanha wrote a letter to Pakistan's government denouncing the Taliban activities in Swat Valley including their destruction of Buddha statues and their attacks on Christians, Sikhs, and Hindus. Gandhara Buddhist artifacts were illegally looted by smugglers. A rehabilitation attempt on the Buddha was made by Luca Olivieri from Italy. A group of Italians helped repair the Buddha.

Bangladesh

In Bangladesh, the persecution of the indigenous tribes of the Chittagong Hill Tracts such as the Chakma, Marma, Tripura and others who are mainly Buddhists, Hindus, Christians, and Animists, has been described as genocidal. The Chittagong Hill Tracts are located bordering India, Myanmar and the Bay of Bengal, and is the home to 500,000 indigenous people. The perpetrators of are the Bangladeshi military and the Bengali Muslim settlers, who together have burned down Buddhist and Hindu temples, killed many Chakmas, and carried out a policy of gang-rape against the indigenous people. There are also accusations of Chakmas being forced to convert to Islam, many of them children who have been abducted for this purpose. The conflict started soon after Bangladeshi independence in 1972 when the Constitution imposed Bengali as the sole official language, Islam as the state religion – with no cultural or linguistic rights to minority populations. Subsequently, the government encouraged and sponsored massive settlement by Bangladeshis in region, which changed the demographics from 98 percent indigenous in 1971 to fifty percent by 2000. The government allocated a full third of the Bangladeshi military to the region to support the settlers, sparking a protracted guerilla war between Hill tribes and the military. During this conflict which officially ended in 1997, and in the subsequent period, a large number of human rights violations against the indigenous peoples have been reported, with violence against indigenous women being particularly extreme. Bengali settlers and soldiers have raped native Jumma (Chakma) women "with impunity" with the Bangladeshi security forces doing little to protect the Jummas and instead assisting the rapists and settlers. The Karuna Bihar Buddhist temple was attacked by Bengali settlers.

Chittagong Hill Tracts had 98.5% Buddhist and Hindu population in 1947 during the partition of India. The British gave the Buddhist dominated land to East Pakistan against the principles of partition and against wishes of indigenous people. Chittagong Hill Tracts is the traditional home of the Chakma, Marma, Tripura, Mro, Khumi and other indigenous tribes who mainly practice Buddhism. Successive Pakistan and Bangladeshi governments had been encouraging Muslim migration into the Chittagong Hill Tracts to dilute the indigenous Buddhist population. Indigenous Buddhist people of Chittagong Hill Tracts resisted the colonization of their land by demographic engineering. In response Bangladesh government sent tens of thousands of military personnel to the Chittagong Hill Tracts to protect the Muslim settlers and fight the indigenous resistance movement named Shanti Bahini.

Bangladesh Army in league with the Muslim settlers committed 13 major massacres in the span of 15 years between 1980 and 1995 slaughtering hundreds of indigenous Buddhist people in each massacre. They committed numerous other massacres killing 10 to 20 people since birth of Bangladesh in 1971. Apart from mass killing Bangladesh and Muslim settlers are involved in extra-judicial execution of the indigenous people. Indigenous people are victims of arbitrary arrest and detention. Bangladesh Army and Muslim settlers often subject them to severe torture and beating. Indigenous Buddhist women and even minor girls are vulnerable to rape by Muslim settlers and Bangladesh army. Bangladesh army and Muslim settlers had raped thousands of indigenous Buddhist women and girls. Indigenous Buddhist people are subjected to systematic proselytization by the Bangladesh government and many Saudi funded Islamic missionary organizations. Bangladesh army also resort to forcible conversion. Bangladesh Army and Muslim settlers destroyed and desecrated hundreds of Buddhist temples in Chittagong Hill Tracts.

Massacres
Between 1980 and 1995, Bangladesh Army and Muslim settlers committed at least 13 major massacres against the indigenous Buddhist people in the Chittagong Hill Tracts. No military personnel or settler was ever tried for these massacres. The massacres are usually carried out to evict indigenous people from their villages or in retaliation to Shanti Bahini attacks.

Kaukhali Massacre 25 March 1980
The commander of the Bangladesh army at Kaukhali ordered the indigenous Buddhist people to gather at Kaukhali Bazar in the morning of 25 March 1980 to discuss the repair of the Poapara Buddhist Vihara. On 25 March 1980, when indigenous Buddhist people gathered at Kaukhali Bazar, Bangladesh Army and Muslim settlers suddenly attacked and massacred an estimated 300 Chakma and Marma Buddhists at Kaukhali in Rangamati district.

Barkal Massacre 31 May 1984
Bangladesh Army and Muslim settlers attacked several Buddhist villages of Bhusanchara, Bhusanbagh, Het Baria, Suguri Para, Goranstan, Tarengya Ghat in Barkal and massacred more than 400 Chakma Buddhists. Amnesty International collected 67 names killed in the massacre.

Panchari Massacre 1–2 May 1986
Bangladesh Army and Muslim settlers attacked indigenous Buddhist villages of Golakpatimachara, Kalanal, Soto Karmapara, Shantipur, Mirjibil, Hetarachara, Pujgang, Logang, Hathimuktipara, Sarveshwarpara, Napidpara and Dewan Bazar. Bangladesh Army and Muslim settlers randomly opened fire on indigenous people massacred hundreds of Chakma Buddhists. Amnesty International collected more than 50 names killed in the massacre.

Matiranga Massacre 1–7 May 1986
Between 1 and 7 May 1986, widespread military operation and persecution forced a group of Tripuri people to take refuge in the jungle between Sarveswarpara and Manudaspara in Matiranga. While they were trying to reach india, Bangladesh Army detected and ambushed them. Bangladesh army massacred at least 60 indigenous Tripuri people.

Matiranga Massacre 18–19 May 1986
To escape systematic persecution, a large group of indigenous Tripuri people were trying to reach India by following jungle trails. However Bangladesh army discovered and surrounded them. Bangladesh army took them to a narrow valley between Comillatila and Taidong in Matiranga. Bangladesh army suddenly opened fire in the restricted space and killed at least 200 indigenous Tripuri people.

Baghaichari Massacre 3–10 August 1988
Bangladesh Army and Muslim settlers launched a week long campaign of terror in retaliation for Shanti Bahini attacks on Bangladeshi armed forces and Muslim settlements. Bangladesh Army and Muslim settlers attacked Durchari, Khedamara, Battuli, Sarwatuli villages in Baghaichari and murdered more than 500 indigenous Chakma Buddhists.

Langadu Massacre 4 May 1989
Un-identified gunmen murdered a Muslim community leader Abdur Rashid of Langadu. Bangladesh military and civil administration suspected Buddhist resistance movement Shanti Bahini murdered the Muslim leader. Bangladesh Army agitated the Muslim settlers. Muslim settlers attacked the indigenous Buddhist people of Langadu with the encouragement of the Bangladesh military ad civil authorities. More than 50 indigenous Buddhist people were massacred with swords and lances.

Malya Massacre 2 Feb 1992
A commuter ferry loaded with people was sailing from Marishya to Rangamati. A bomb exploded at Malya in Langadu Upazila. According to eyewitnesses, two Bangladesh military personnel planted the bomb. Bangladesh government had settled many Muslim settlers at Malya by displacing indigenous Buddhist people. The survivors of the explosion swam to the shore. But Muslim settlers were waiting for them with weapons and attacked them when reached the shore. More than 30 indigenous Buddhist people were massacred.

Logang Massacre 10 April 1992
2 Muslim settlers armed with swords attempted to rape indigenous Buddhist girls who were grazing cows at Logang in Panchari. An indigenous man defended the girls and was killed in the brawl. The Muslim settler ran to the Bangladesh Army camp and spread the rumor that indigenous people attacked them. In reprisal Bangladesh Army and Muslim settlers attacked indigenous people at Logang and massacred more than 500 indigenous people.

Naniachar Massacre 17 November 1993
Indigenous Buddhist people demanded the Bangladesh Army check post at Naniachar in Rangamati be removed. Bangladesh Army often harassed indigenous Buddhist people from the check post at Naniachar Ferry Stoppage. Indigenous Buddhist people gathered at Naniachar Bazar to protest harassment. Muslim settlers with the direct help from the Bangladesh Army attacked the peaceful demonstration of the indigenous people and murdered at least 66 indigenous people.

Unlawful killing
Besides mass killing, indigenous Buddhist people are also killed in small numbers by Bangladesh Army and Muslim settlers. Most common form of killing occurs when indigenous people are detained and beaten in numerous Bangladeshi military, intelligence and police installations in the CHT. Killings also occur when Bangladesh Army randomly open fire at villagers. Bangladesh Government provides weapons to Muslim settlers and they are also responsible for killing of indigenous people. The Muslim settlers often join the armed forces in raid of indigenous villages and involved in killing indigenous people by firearms or crude sharp weapons. The settlers also take part in communal riots instigated by the Bangladesh Army and kill indigenous Buddhist people.

Detention and torture
Indigenous people are detained without warrant and often tortured in the custody of Bangladeshi armed forces. Bangladeshi armed forces detain and torture indigenous Buddhist people on mere suspicion of being members of the Shanti Bahini or helping the Shanti Bahini. There were numerous check posts on highways and ferries in the Chittagong Hill Tracts. Bangladeshi armed forces interrogate and detain indigenous travelers from these check posts. Bangladeshi armed forces raid indigenous Buddhist villages and torture indigenous people on suspicion of sheltering and feeding the Shanti Bahini.

Indigenous people who are detained in military camps and cantonments are subjected to severe beating, electrocution, water boarding, hanging upside down, shoving burning cigarettes on bodies etc. Prisoners are detained in pits and trenches. Bangladeshi soldiers sprinkle hot water on indigenous prisoners. Indigenous captives are then taken out for interrogation one at a time. Indigenous people are often tortured during interrogation.

Rape and abduction
Bangladesh Government tacitly encourages Bangladesh Army and Muslim settlers to rape indigenous girls and women as tool to expel them from their traditional land. As a result thousands of indigenous girls and women were raped by the armed forces and settlers since independence of Bangladesh in 1971.

Bangladeshi Army in league with the Muslim settlers raid indigenous villages, separate men from women and rape indigenous girls and women. Bangladesh Army and Muslim settlers often rape indigenous girls and women in front of their husbands and parents. Bangladesh Army and Muslim settlers also target indigenous girls and women when they go to markets, schools or go to fetch water or fire wood.

Land Grab
Since vast majority of the indigenous people are farmers and cultivators, land is very important and only means of survival. The government's sponsored settlement in the CHT dispossessed many indigenous people of their lands.

Often Bangladesh Army expels indigenous people from their villages by massacres, arsons and constant harassments. Bangladeshi Army then give emptied villages to the Muslim settlers. In many cases Bangladesh Army builds settlements near indigenous villages. The Muslim settlers then gradually encroach on the lands of indigenous Buddhist people.

Another way to grab indigenous land is to build military camps on indigenous land with little or no compensation and then constantly harass the indigenous people by intimidation, extortion, interrogation, rape which forces indigenous people to leave their villages.

During the 2012 Ramu violence a 25,000-strong mob set fire to at least five temples and dozens of homes throughout the town and surrounding villages after seeing a picture of an allegedly desecrated Quran, which they claimed had been posted on Facebook by Uttam Barua, a local Buddhist man.

India

The Ladakh Buddhist Association has said: "There is a deliberate and organised design to convert Kargil's Buddhists to Islam.  In the last four years, about 50 girls and married women with children were taken and converted from village Wakha alone.  If this continues unchecked, we fear that Buddhists will be wiped out from Kargil in the next two decades or so.  Anyone objecting to such allurement and conversions is harassed."

The Mahabodhi Temple, a UNESCO World Heritage Site, is one of the most sacred Buddhist temple in Bodh Gaya, marking the location where Gautama Buddha is said to have attained Enlightenment. On 7 July 2013, a series of ten bombs exploded in and around the Mahabodhi Temple complex. Five people, including two Buddhist monks, were injured by the blasts. Three other devices were defused by bomb-disposal squads at a number of locations in Gaya. On 4 November 2013, the National Investigation Agency announced that the Islamic terrorist group Indian Mujahideen was responsible for the bombings.

Maldives

The destruction of the Buddhist artifacts by Islamists took place on the day in which Mohamed Nasheed was toppled as president in a coup.

Buddhist antiquities were obliterated by Islamist radicals in the National Museum. The Museum was stormed by Islamists who destroyed the Buddhist artifacts.

The non Muslim artifacts of Buddhist provenance were specifically singled out by the attackers. The destruction was caught on camera.

Most of Maldive's Buddhist physical history was obliterated.

Hindu artifacts were also targeted for obliteration and the actions have been compared to the attacks on the Buddhas of Bamiyan by the Taliban.

7 February 2012 was the date of the anti-Buddhist attack by the Islamists.

Myanmar
The violence and long lasting tension was reignited on 28 May 2012. It was reported that daughter of U Hla Tin, of Thabyechaung Village named Ma Thida Htwe aged 27 was violently raped then murdered by three Muslims. These men were later arrested.

Tensions between Buddhist and Muslim ethnic groups flared into violent clashes in Meiktila, Mandalay Division in 2013. The violence started on 20 March after a Muslim gold shop owner, his wife, and two Muslim employees assaulted a Buddhist customer and her husband in an argument over a golden hairpin. A large Buddhist mob formed and began to destroy the shop. The heavily outnumbered police reportedly told the mob to disperse after they had destroyed the shop.

On the same day, a local Buddhist monk passing on the back of a motorbike was attacked by four Muslims. According to witnesses, the driver was attacked with a sword, causing him to crash, while the monk was also hit in the head with the sword. Per a witness, one of the men doused the monk with fuel and burnt him alive. The monk died in the hospital. The killing of the monk caused the relatively contained situation to explode, greatly increasing intensity and violence.

Thailand 

Primarily Thai central government has been involved in a civil war with Muslim insurgents in Thailand's three southernmost Muslim-majority provinces of Yala, Narathiwat and Pattani. There are quite a number of cases of Buddhist civilians in these regions that have been beheaded by Muslim insurgents, Buddhist monks and Buddhist school teachers are frequently threatened with death and murdered. Shootings of Buddhists are quite frequent in the South, as are bombings, and attacks on Buddhist temples.

Xinjiang
During the Kumul Rebellion in Xinjiang in the 1930s, Buddhist murals were deliberately vandalized by Muslims.

Buddhist murals at the Bezeklik Thousand Buddha Caves were damaged by local Muslim population whose religion proscribed figurative images of sentient beings, the eyes and mouths in particular were often gouged out.  Pieces of murals were also broken off for use as fertilizer by the locals.

Uyghur Muslim opposition to a Buddhist Aspara statue in Ürümqi in Xinjiang was cited as a possible reason for its destruction in 2012. A Muslim Kazakh viewed a giant Buddha statue near Ürümqi as "alien cultural symbols".

Indonesia

Nine bombs were detonated at the Borobudur Buddhist temple located in Central Java on 21 January 1985, causing nine stupas on upper rounded terraces of Arupadhatu to be badly damaged and there were no human casualties in this attack. A Buddhist monastery in Jakarta was attacked by suspected local Islamic militants on 4 August 2013 at 6:53 p.m. Three people were injured in this attack.

In the village of Kebon Baru (Banten), an Islamic group forced a Buddhist monk, Mulyanto Nurhalim to sign an agreement to force him to abandon his home and wrongfully accused him of religious proselytism.

On 29July 2016, several Buddhist vihara were plundered and burnt down by Muslim mobs in Tanjung Balai of North Sumatra. On 26 November 2016, a homemade bomb was discovered in front of Vihara Buddha Tirta, a Buddhist temple in Lhok Seumawe of Aceh.

Persecution by Christians

India 
The National Socialist Council of Nagaland has been accused of demanding money and food from Buddhists living along the Assam-Arunachal border. It has also been accused by Buddhists of forcing locals to convert to Christianity. The NSCN is also suspected of burning down the Rangphra temple in Arunachal Pradesh.

The National Liberation Front of Tripura has shut down and attacked Hindu and Buddhist orphanages, hospitals, temples and schools in Tripura. They have also been accused of force converting Buddhists to Christianity.

A mass scale ethnic riot was initiated by the Baptist Church in Tripura in 1980 by which both Hindu and Buddhist tribes faced systematic ethnic cleansing. Thousands of women were kidnapped and then raped and even forced to convert to Christianity. Reports state that the terrorists received aid from international Christian groups. The Christian tribals also received aid from the NLFT. This was the state's worst ethnic riot.

Japan 
In Sengoku period Japan, as several daimyos and their subjects converted to Christianity via the efforts of Jesuit missionaries, the destruction of Buddhist and Shinto temples and shrines would often accompany it, with the Jesuits also contributing to the destruction and persecutions. Buddhist monks would face persecution by being forcefully evicted out of the temples which would then be reused as churches. Christian daimyos would also force Buddhist monks to marry. Additionally, Buddhist relics hidden by monks would be sought out and destroyed. The Jesuit missionaries were intolerant of Shintoism and Buddhism, considering them as idol-worship propagated by the devil. Christian converts believed that Shinto and Buddhist deities were evil spirits whose influence could be eliminated via the destruction of their religious sites.

In the religious history of Japan, efforts to eliminate native or localized religions like Buddhism and Shinto by force and replace them with a different creed altogether was a phenomenon never experienced before in Japan. The disregard on the part of Christians towards the religious pluralism found in Japanese spirituality was similarly seen as foreign. The destruction of religious sites by Christians even in peacetime and as a purely religious act was also seen as unparalleled by the Japanese authorities. This along with other more political factors eventually led the Japanese authorities to release an edict forbidding the practice of Christianity in the nation, with a 1587 edict by Toyotomi Hideyoshi stating "Japan is the land of the Gods and so it is undesirable that evil doctrines from Christian lands be propagated. To approach the inhabitants of our lands, make them into followers and destroy shrines and temples is unprecedented behavior."

South Korea
There was also a series of Buddhist temple burnings in the 1980s and 1990s, and attacks on Buddhist artwork have continued.  In one instance, a Protestant minister used a microphone on a cord as a bolo weapon and smashed temple paintings and a statue. In other instances, red crosses have been painted on temple walls, murals, and statues.  Buddha statues have also been decapitated.  Furthermore, students at Buddhist universities report aggressive attempts by Christians to convert them on campus, especially near campus temples.

Some South Korean Buddhists have denounced what they view as discriminatory measures against them and their religion by the administration of President Lee Myung-bak, which they attribute to Lee's membership in the Somang Presbyterian Church in Seoul. Of particular note was after Lee Myung-bak's ascendence to the Presidency when the high proportion of Christians in relation to Buddhists in the public sector became known–particularly the president's cabinet, where there were twelve Christians to only one Buddhist.

The Buddhist Jogye Order has accused the Lee government of discriminating against Buddhism and favoring Christianity by ignoring certain Buddhist temples but including Christian churches in certain public documents. In 2006, according to the Asia Times, "Lee also sent a video prayer message to a Christian rally held in the southern city of Busan in which the worship leader prayed feverishly: 'Lord, let the Buddhist temples in this country crumble down! Further, according to an article in Buddhist-Christian Studies: "Over the course of the last decade [1990s] a fairly large number of Buddhist temples in South Korea have been destroyed or damaged by fire by misguided Christian fundamentalists. More recently, Buddhist statues have been identified as idols, and attacked and decapitated in the name of Jesus. Arrests are hard to effect, as the arsonists and vandals work by stealth of night."  A 2008 incident in which police investigated protesters who had been given sanctuary in the Jogye temple in Seoul and searched a car driven by Jigwan, executive chief of the Jogye order, led to protests by Buddhists who claimed that police had treated Jigwan as a criminal.

In March 2009, in an effort to reach out to Buddhists affected by recent events, the President and First Lady participated in a Korean Buddhist conference where he and his wife were seen joining palms in prayer during chanting along with participants. The discomfort among the Buddhists has gradually decreased since then.

Sri Lanka
In 1815, the British army captured the Kingdom of Kandy and deposed the Sinhalese monarch ending a line of Buddhist kings lasting 2301 years, they colonized Sri Lanka until 1948. Like the Dutch, the British refused to register unbaptized infants and to accept non-Christian marriages. Christians were openly favored for jobs and promotions. The British also supported various Christian missionary groups to established Christian schools on the island. Education in these Christian schools (which disparaged Buddhism) was a requirement for government office. Missionaries also wrote tracts in Sinhalese attacking Buddhism and promoting Christianity. Robert Inglis, a 19th-century British Conservative, likened Buddhism to "idolatry" during a parliamentary debate over the relationship of "Buddhist priests" to the British colonial government, in 1852. In the 19th century, a national Buddhist movement began as a response to Christian proselytizing and suppression, and was empowered by the results of the Panadura debate between Christian priests and Buddhist monks such as Migettuwatte Gunananda Thera and Hikkaduwe Sri Sumangala Thera which was widely seen as a victory for the Buddhists.

United States

In February 1942, President Franklin D. Roosevelt signed into law Executive Order 9066. This gave the military discretion to do whatever it deemed necessary to secure the safety and security of the United States. "The Army removed all persons of Japanese ancestry—more than 110,000 men, women, and children—from the west coast and put them in camps surrounded by barbed wire and guard towers. Anyone with even a drop of Japanese blood was rounded up and incarcerated". The wartime incarceration, which the religion played in the evaluation of whether or not they could be considered fully American because vast majority of them were Buddhists. In Hawaiian Islands, the authorities were particularly anxious to remove leaders of the religious community. Four days prior to the Attack on Pearl Harbor, 347 Japanese individuals were arrested and the majority of Buddhist leaders in the initial roundup were not simply a panicked reaction to a sudden military emergency, but the enactment of an already considered contingency plan. The Army also gave preferential treatment to Christians, despite the tens of thousands of Japanese-American Buddhists who served in the armed services during World War II in both the Pacific and European theaters.

In 2020, Christian Fundamentalists vandalized six Buddhist temples amid growing anti-Asian violence. The following year, a Buddhist temple in Los Angeles was burned and suffered other damages, including a broken glass door and a knocked down lantern.

Vietnam

As early as 1953 rumoured allegations had surfaced of discrimination against Buddhists in Vietnam. These allegations stated that Catholic Vietnamese armed by the French had been raiding villages. By 1961, the shelling of pagodas in Vietnam was being reported in the Australian and American media.

After the Catholic Ngô Đình Diệm came to power in South Vietnam, backed by the United States, he favoured his relatives and fellow Catholics over Buddhists and dedicated the country to the Virgin Mary in 1959. Though Buddhists made up 80% of Vietnam's population, Catholics were given high positions in the army and civil service. Half of the 123 National Assembly members were Catholic. Buddhists also required special government permits to hold large meetings, a stipulation generally made for meetings of trade unions. In May 1963, the government forbade the flying of Buddhist flags on Vesak. After Buddhist protesters clashed with government troops, nine people were killed. In protest, the Buddhist monk Thích Quảng Đức burned himself to death in Saigon. On 21 August, the Xá Lợi Pagoda raids led to a death toll estimated in the hundreds.

Persecution in Nepal

The banishment of Buddhist monks from Nepal was part of a Rana government campaign to suppress the resurgence of Theravada Buddhism in Nepal in the early decades of the 20th century. There were two deportations of monks from Kathmandu, in 1926 and 1944.

The exiled monks were the first group of monks to be seen in Nepal since the 14th century. They were at the forefront of a movement to revive Theravada Buddhism which had disappeared from the country more than five hundred years ago. The Rana regime disapproved of Buddhism and Nepal Bhasa, the mother tongue of the Newar people. It saw the activities of the monks and their growing following as a threat. When police harassment and imprisonment failed to deter the monks, all of whom were Newars, they were deported.

Among the charges made against them were preaching a new faith, converting Hindus, encouraging women to renounce and thereby undermining family life and writing books in Nepal Bhasa.

Persecution under Communism

Cambodia under the Khmer Rouge
The Khmer Rouge, under its policy of state atheism, actively imposed an atheistic agrarian revolution, resulting in the persecution of ethnic minorities and Buddhist monks during their reign from 1975 to 1979. Buddhist institutions and temples were destroyed and Buddhist monks and teachers were killed in large numbers. A third of the nation's monasteries were destroyed along with numerous holy texts and items of high artistic quality. 25,000 Buddhist monks were massacred by the regime. Pol Pot believed that Buddhism was a decadent affectation, and he sought to eliminate its 1,500-year-old mark on Cambodia, while still maintaining the structures of the traditional Buddhist base.

China

Since the Chinese Communist Revolution of 1949, Buddhism was severely restricted and brought under state-control at times. In addition, "Marxist–Leninist atheism has been widely publicized, resulting in steadily decreasing religious communities", especially in areas with developed economies. In 1989, less than 12% of the population held religious beliefs. During the Cultural Revolution, Chinese Buddhists were actively persecuted and sent for re-education, while Buddhist temples, statues, and sutras were vandalized and destroyed by the Red Guards for many years due to the anti-religious campaign in Communist China. In recent years, Buddhism in China has been undergoing a revival but most Buddhist institutions are within the confines of the state.

Tibet

Although many Buddhist temples and monasteries have been rebuilt after the Cultural Revolution, Tibetan Buddhists have largely been confined by the Government of the People's Republic of China. Tibetan Buddhist monks and nuns have been reported, incarcerated, tortured, and killed by the Chinese military, according to all human rights organizations. There were over 6,000 Buddhist monasteries in Tibet, and nearly all of them were ransacked and destroyed by the Chinese communists, mainly during the Cultural Revolution. Analysis of a bulk of documents has shown that many Tibetan Buddhist monasteries were destroyed by the Chinese communists before the cultural revolution. Moreover, the "Chinese Communist Party has launched a three-year drive to promote atheism in the Buddhist region of Tibet", with Xiao Huaiyuan, a leader in the Chinese Communist Party Propaganda Department in Tibet, stating that it would "help peasants and herdsmen free themselves from the negative influence of religion. Intensifying propaganda on atheism is especially important for Tibet because atheism plays an extremely important role in promoting economic construction, social advancement and socialist spiritual civilization in the region." He further said it would push "people of all ethnic groups in the region to raise their ideological and ethical quality, to learn a civilized and healthy life style and to strive to build a united, prosperous and civilized new Tibet."

Mongolia
Buddhist monks were persecuted in Mongolia during communist rule up until revolutionary democratization in 1990. Khorloogiin Choibalsan declared 17,000 of the monks to be enemies of the state and deported them to Siberian labor camps, where many perished. Almost all of Mongolia's over 700 Buddhist monasteries were looted or destroyed.

North Korea
The Oxford Handbook of Atheism states that "North Korea maintains a state-sanctioned and enforced atheism". During the 1960s and 1970s, "North Korea effectively exterminated all signs of Buddhism" in the country.

Soviet Union
Buddhism was persecuted and looked down upon by the Soviet authorities under the government policy of state atheism. Adherents were attacked by the authorities. In 1929, the government of the USSR closed many monasteries and arrested monks, sending them into exile. As government efforts brought Sovietization to Buryatia and Kalmykia, the clergy were reduced.

Vietnam
Despite the communist regime's hostility, Buddhism is still widely practiced in Vietnam. According to Human Rights News, "Vietnam continues to systematically imprison and persecute independent Buddhists as well as followers of other religions." The leaders of the Unified Buddhist Congregation of Vietnam, Thích Huyền Quang and Thích Quảng Độ were imprisoned for decades. Thich Nhat Hanh has spoken out about the wiping out of his spiritual tradition in Vietnam.

See also
 History of Buddhism

References

Notes

Citations

Sources

Further reading

 
 
 Elliot and Dowson (1867–1877). The History of India as told by its own Historians, London: Trübner. Reprint, New Delhi 1990.
 Majumdar, R. C. (ed.), The History and Culture of the Indian People, Volume VII, The Mughal Empire, Bombay, 1973.
 Repression of Buddhism in Sri Lanka by Portuguese by Senaka Weeraratna

 
Anti-Buddhism
Buddhists